Benin competed at the 2016 Summer Olympics in Rio de Janeiro, Brazil, from 5 to 21 August 2016. This was the nation's eleventh appearance at the Summer Olympics, with the exception of the 1976 Summer Olympics in Montreal because of the African boycott.

Benin National Olympic and Sports Committee selected a team of six athletes, four men and two women, for the Games, competing in athletics, fencing, judo, and swimming. All of them made their maiden Olympic appearance, with sabre fencer Yémi Apithy leading the Benin team as the nation's flag bearer in the opening ceremony. Benin, however, has yet to win its first Olympic medal.

Athletics (track and field)
 
Benin athletes achieved qualifying standards in the following athletics events (up to a maximum of 3 athletes in each event):

Track & road events

Fencing

Following the completion of the Grand Prix finals, Benin has entered one fencer into the Olympic competition. Yémi Apithy claimed an Olympic spot in the men's sabre as one of the two highest-ranked fencers from Africa outside the world's top 14 in the FIE Adjusted Official Rankings, signifying the country's debut in the sport.

Judo

Benin qualified one judoka for the men's middleweight category (90 kg) at the Games. Celtus Dossou Yovo earned a continental quota spot from the African region as Benin's top-ranked judoka outside of direct qualifying position in the IJF World Ranking List of 30 May 2016.

Swimming

Benin received universality invitations from FINA to send two swimmers (one male and one female).

References

External links

 
 

Nations at the 2016 Summer Olympics
2016
Olympics